The rayleigh is a unit of photon flux, used to measure faint light emitted in the sky, such as airglow and auroras. It was first proposed in 1956 by Donald M. Hunten, Franklin E. Roach, and Joseph W. Chamberlain. It is named for Robert Strutt, 4th Baron Rayleigh (1875–1947). Its symbol is R (also used for the röntgen, an unrelated unit). SI prefixes are used with the rayleigh.

One rayleigh (1 R) is defined as a column emission rate of 1010 photons per square metre per column per second. Note that rayleigh is an apparent emission rate, as no allowances have been made for scattering or absorption. The night sky has an intensity of about 250 R, while auroras can reach values of 1000 kR.

The relationship between photon radiance, L, (in units of photons per square metre per second per steradian) and I (in units of rayleighs) is

References

Units of luminous flux